The Samsung Galaxy Buds are a line of wireless Bluetooth earbuds designed by Samsung Electronics. They were first released on March 9, 2019, as the successor to the Samsung Gear IconX.

Models

Galaxy Buds 
The original Samsung Galaxy Buds (SM-R170) launched on March 8, 2019. The launch price was $129.99, and included a wireless charging case. The Buds were discontinued when the Buds Plus was released.

Galaxy Buds Plus 
The Galaxy Buds Plus (SM-R175) were announced on February 11, 2020, at the spring Galaxy Unpacked event. The Buds Plus were released on February 14, priced at $149.99, a $20 price increase from the original Buds. The Buds Plus maintained the same design as the original Buds, but reviewers praised the improved sound and microphone quality and significantly increased battery life. Additionally, a second driver for bass was included to enhance audio quality at lower frequencies.

Galaxy Buds Live 

The Galaxy Buds Live (SM-R180) were announced on August 5, 2020, during a virtual Galaxy Unpacked event. The Buds Live were notable for their "bean" like on-ear design, a departure from the previous in ear design used in the buds lineup. The Buds Live were the first Galaxy Buds device to launch with active noise cancellation. The Buds Live were praised for their design, but criticised for the ineffective active noise cancellation.

Galaxy Buds Pro 
The Galaxy Buds Pro (SM-R190) were announced on January 14, 2021, and launched the following day, on January 15. The Buds Pro improved upon the design of the Galaxy Buds Plus and included improved audio, head tracking technology, and active noise cancellation. They were praised for their improved design and sound quality, but criticized for their 5-hour battery life when active noise cancellation is on.

Galaxy Buds 2 

The Galaxy Buds 2 (SM-R177) were announced on August 11, 2021, at Galaxy Unpacked alongside the Galaxy Watch 4. The Buds 2 were seen as the successor to the Buds Plus, which were discontinued following the announcement. The Buds 2 include active noise cancellation, and cost less than the Buds Pro, and were praised for their all around performance for the price.

Galaxy Buds 2 Pro 
The Galaxy Buds 2 Pro (SM-R510) were announced on August 10, 2022, at Galaxy Unpacked alongside the Galaxy Watch 5. The Buds 2 Pro were seen as the successor to the Buds Pro, which were discontinued following the announcement. The Buds 2 Pro include active noise cancellation, 24-bit Hi-Fi audio support (only for Samsung device with One UI 4.0 or above) and enhanced 360-degree audio. They were released on August 26, 2022, with a launch price of $229.99, a $30 price increase compared to the original Galaxy Buds Pro.

Gallery

References 

Samsung wearable devices
Bluetooth speakers